Ludovico Kempter (11 November 1913 – 27 August 2001) was an Argentine sailor. He competed in the 5.5 Metre event at the 1952 Summer Olympics.

References

External links
 

1913 births
2001 deaths
Argentine male sailors (sport)
Olympic sailors of Argentina
Sailors at the 1952 Summer Olympics – 5.5 Metre
Sportspeople from Buenos Aires